Armenakis Yekarian (1870–1926) was an Armenian fedayee. Yekarian was born in Van, Ottoman Empire. He joined the Armenian national liberation movement through the ranks of the Armenakans in 1888. His early education was at Varagavank monastery. In 1896, during the defense of Van, he obtaining weapons from Persia to organize self-defense in the city. He was imprisoned with 40 of his comrades and then released at the end of the conflict. Thereafter, he left the Ottoman Empire as required by the Sultan. He took refuge in Urmia in Persia. After the deposition of the Sultan by the Young Turk Revolution, he returned to Van in 1908. He joined the Van resistance in 1915. After the Armenian victory, they set up an Armenian provisional government, with Aram Manukian at its head. Armenak Yekarian became the police chief. Aram Manoukian, Armenak Yekarian and others tried to give a national-civil character to the exclusively militarized administration. In 1922, he emigrated with his family to Cairo, Egypt, where he died in 1926. His family moved to Soviet Armenia in 1947.

Further reading
 L. Adjemian: Husher Armenak Yekariani, Cairo 1947, [Memoirs of Armenak Yekarian]

Notes

External links
 Arménak Yekarian, hero of Van (French)

1870 births
1926 deaths
People from Van, Turkey
Armenian fedayi
Armenian nationalists
Armenian people of World War I
Armenian revolutionaries
Prisoners and detainees of the Ottoman Empire
Armenian genocide survivors
Armenian Democratic Liberal Party politicians
Armenians from the Ottoman Empire
Armenian expatriates in Iran